Glonn is a river of Upper Bavaria, Bavaria, Germany.

It rises southeast of Mittelstetten in the district of Fürstenfeldbruck. It is the main tributary of the Amper; at Allershausen near Freising it discharges from the left into the Amper.

The Glonn flows through an agriculturally used area in the triangle between Augsburg, Freising and Dachau. Larger places in its course are Odelzhausen, Erdweg, Markt Indersdorf, Weichs, Petershausen and Hohenkammer.

Tributaries

 Kollbach
 Röhrersbach (left)
 Tegernbach (left)
 Rettenbach (left)
 Schweinbach (right)
 Umbach (left)
 Rohrbach (right)
 Steinfurter Bach (left)
 Steindlbach (right)
 Zeitlbach (left)
 Riensbach (right)
 Dorfbach (right)
 Eichhofner Bach or Albersbach, resp. (left)
 Rothbach (right)
 Gittersbach (left)
 Langenpettenbach (left)
 Ebersbach
 Klausnerbach

See also
List of rivers of Bavaria

References

Rivers of Bavaria
Rivers of Germany